Memorial Gymnasium may refer to:

In the United States:
 Memorial Athletic and Convocation Center at Kent State University in Kent, Ohio, known as Memorial Gym from 1956 to 1991
 Memorial Gymnasium (Grambling State), Grambling, Louisiana
 Memorial Gymnasium (University of Idaho), Moscow, Idaho
 Memorial Gymnasium (University of Maine), Orono, Maine
 Memorial Gymnasium (McNeese State), Lake Charles, Louisiana
 Memorial Gymnasium (University of Texas at El Paso), El Paso, Texas
 Memorial Gymnasium (Vanderbilt University), Nashville, Tennessee
 Memorial Gymnasium (Virginia), at the University of Virginia, Charlottesville, Virginia
 Scotty Robertson Memorial Gymnasium, Ruston, Louisiana

See also 
 War Memorial Gymnasium, at the University of San Francisco
 Memorial Coliseum (disambiguation)
 Memorial Stadium (disambiguation)